Şerbettar can refer to:

 Şerbettar, Havsa
 Şerbettar railway station